Line 1 of the Tianjin Metro runs from the north-west to the south-east of downtown Tianjin.

The line started operations on 12 June 2006. It was rebuilt from the original Tianjin Metro line, which opened in 1976, but had to close down and undergo renovations in 2001 as part of the system's modernizing project. The line's color is red.

History 
Construction began in 1970. The first section, spanning 3.6 km of track and 4 stations,  which are named Xinhualu,  and  stations, was completed by February 1976. After construction resumed, the total length was 7.4 km, with 8 stations, and service on the line began on 28 December 1984.

To cut construction costs, the authority used an abandoned canal bed to build part of the system. Thus the underground section is only 2–3 meters beneath the street surface, and was the world's shallowest metro. Years later, train frequency reduced and trains were commonly delayed. The rolling stock had become dilapidated, with most seat covers torn off, and lights becoming dim. To change to a more modern and cleaner system, a modernization plan was laid out in 2000. In preparation, the system was closed on 1 September 2001, with renovation starting on 21 November after being delayed due to the terrorist attacks of 11 September.

In 2008,  Station was temporarily closed for the reconstruction of Tianjin West railway station. It reopened on 1 July 2011.

In 2016, the at-grade  station was closed. On 3 December 2018, Shuanglin station was reopened as a new underground station.

On 3 December 2018, Line 1 also extended one station, from Shuanglin station to  station.

On 28 December 2019, four stations on the eastern extension (Gaozhuangzi, Beiyangcun, Guozhanlu, Donggulu) was opened.

On 12 May 2021, Beiyangcun station renamed to Guojiahuizhanzhongxin station, and Guozhanlu station renamed to Guoruilu station.

The signal system was also replaced by the new ATO system, and the running stock was also overhauled.

Details
Coaches per train - 6.
Frequency - 3-4 minutes in peak hours & 8 minutes at other times.
Operating hours - 5:30 to 22:30.

Infrastructure

Alignment and interchanges
The line is underground between Qinjiandao and  stations, as well as Shuanglin and Lilou. The other nine stations are elevated. All elevated stations are entirely covered by a mixture of transparent & opaque corrugated sheets. The line passes through six districts, namely Beichen, Hongqiao, Nankai, Heping, Hexi and Jinnan. The whole journey takes about 50 minutes. The line is linked to other subway lines: 2 3 5 and 6. And interchanges to future lines will be available with line 4 7 8 10 and 11.

Concourse Level
All line 1 station concourses are equipped with a customer service center, ticket vending machines, automatic fare gates, and bank ATMs.

Platform level
For security and other reasons, all line 1 stations have platform-edge doors installed. TVs are installed that display travel tips, advertising, alerts, and waiting time for the next train.

Opening timeline

Stations (southeast to northwest)

Rolling Stock

References

Tianjin Metro lines
750 V DC railway electrification
1984 establishments in China
Railway lines opened in 1984